Alfredo Xeque (born 12 January 1969) is a Mexican former light flyweight boxer, based in Campeche, who competed from 1985 to 1992. His record stands at 19 wins, 7 losses and 2 draws after 28 professional bouts.

References

1969 births
Living people
Boxers from Campeche
Light-flyweight boxers
Mexican male boxers